Kwadwo Bedihene known professionally as 1ucid (stylized as 1UCID, pronounced "lucid"), is a Ghanaian singer-songwriter, creative and a record producer based in United States. He is known for his single Miss You which peaked on US, Netherlands, Ghana, Nigeria, and France iTunes Charts.

Early life and education 
Kwadwo was born in Accra, Ghana but relocated to the United States of America at the age of 9 where he grew up. He holds a Bachelor of Science from the University of Akron.

Career

2021: Beginnings 
Kwadwo started as a creative in 2021 where he released a documentary which was inspired by Ghanaian theologian, Mensa Otabil’s sermon "A Generational Thinker".

2022: Present 
In 2022, Kwadwo released two singles "Miss You" and "It’s Giving" Same year, he covered Pulse Nigeria Future Sounds playlist. In January 2023, Kwadwo was cited as one of the artists to look out for by P.M News. Same year, he was announced by Audiomack as one of the top trending artistes alongside Snazzy the Optimist, Asake and Kizz Daniel and was one of the most streamed artistes first week of February 2023.

References

External links 

 Official website

Living people
Ghanaian musicians
Nigerian musicians
American record producers
Year of birth missing (living people)